is a Japanese doctor and politician serving in the House of Representatives in the Diet (national legislature) as a member of the Liberal Democratic Party. A native of Nakama, Fukuoka he attended Nagasaki University, earning a doctoral degree in medicine. He also attended The Eppley Institute for Research in Cancer at the University of Nebraska Medical Center in Omaha, Nebraska for two years. He was elected for the first time in 2005 after serving in the local assembly of Nagasaki Prefecture from 1999 to 2003. He is also a member of Médecins Sans Frontières, among other organizations.

References

External links 
 Official website

1948 births
Living people
People from Nakama, Fukuoka
Nagasaki University alumni
University of Nebraska alumni
Japanese surgeons
Koizumi Children
Members of the House of Representatives (Japan)
Liberal Democratic Party (Japan) politicians